A Trafford Metropolitan Borough Council election took place on 22 May 2014 to elect members of Trafford Metropolitan Borough Council in England. This was on the same day as other local elections. One third of the council was up for election, with each successful candidate serving a four-year term of office, expiring in 2018. The Conservative Party held overall control of the council.

The current composition of the Council is as follows:

Results

By ward

Altrincham ward
In June 2017 Councillor Matthew Sephton was suspended from the Conservative Party after being arrested and charged with making and sharing indecent images of children. He continued to serve as an independent councillor until January 2018 upon his being found guilty and sentenced to two years, nine months imprisonment.

322

Ashton upon Mersey ward

Bowdon ward

Broadheath ward

Brooklands ward

Bucklow-St. Martins ward

Clifford ward

Davyhulme East ward

Davyhulme West ward

Flixton ward

Gorse Hill ward

Hale Barns ward

Hale Central ward

Longford ward

Priory ward

Sale Moor ward

St. Mary's ward

Stretford ward

Timperley ward

Urmston ward

Village ward

References

External links
 

2014 English local elections
2014
2010s in Greater Manchester